"On Parables" (German: "Von den Gleichnissen") is a short story fragment by Franz Kafka. It was not published until 1931, seven years after his death. Max Brod selected stories and published them in the collection Beim Bau der Chinesischen Mauer. The first English translation by Willa and Edwin Muir was published by Martin Secker in London in 1933. It appeared in The Great Wall of China. Stories and Reflections (New York City: Schocken Books, 1946).

The piece consists of a narrative on the merit of parables. The debate is about whether they are useful, or merely folklore handed down from one generation to the next. The narrator mentions that parables are not necessarily useful; after all, they've been around for many years and yet, despite their "wisdom," people still struggle with the same difficulties. The story ends by claiming that the text in itself can be interpreted as a parable.

Analysis

The story was written while Kafka was reading Judaica and was particularly interested in the lore associated with Mishna. Kafka's The Blue Octavo Notebooks are full of parables, many observations about daily life intertwined with poignant twists.

References

Parables
Short stories by Franz Kafka
Short stories published posthumously